Dovydas Neverauskas (born January 14, 1993) is a Lithuanian professional baseball pitcher for the Frederick Atlantic League Team of the Atlantic League of Professional Baseball. He has previously played in Major League Baseball (MLB) for the Pittsburgh Pirates, and played in Nippon Professional Baseball (NPB) for the Hiroshima Toyo Carp. He was the first player from Lithuania in MLB and NPB history.

Career

Amateur
Neverauskas's father, who coaches youth baseball and national teams and promotes the sport in Lithuania, encouraged him to play baseball, despite it not being well known in the country. Neverauskas said there were no baseball fields in the country. He attended training camps in Italy to better learn the game. He attended his first MLB game in 2006 on a trip with his father. He attended MLB's European Baseball Academy in 2008 and 2009.

Pittsburgh Pirates
Neverauskas signed with the Pirates as a free agent in 2009. He was converted into a relief pitcher in 2015. He began the 2016 season with the Altoona Curve of the Class AA Eastern League, and was promoted to the Indianapolis Indians of the Class AAA International League in June. He pitched a scoreless inning in the 2016 All-Star Futures Game. The Pirates added him to their 40-man roster after the 2016 season.

On April 24, 2017, Neverauskas made his Major League Baseball debut for the Pittsburgh Pirates against the Chicago Cubs. He pitched two innings, allowed one run, and had one strikeout. Neverauskas picked up his first Major League win on August 6, 2017, when the Pirates defeated the San Diego Padres in 11 innings. He pitched two scoreless innings, giving up two hits and striking out three. He finished the season for the Pirates pitching in  innings with a 3.91 ERA. The following season, he pitched the majority of the season at the AAA level, registering an ERA of 8 for the Pirates in 25 games.

Neverauskas was designated for assignment by the Pirates on November 1, 2020, and released on November 3.

Hiroshima Toyo Carp
On November 16, 2020, Neverauskas signed a one-year, $875,000 contract with the Hiroshima Toyo Carp of Nippon Professional Baseball (NPB) for the 2021 season. He made his NPB debut on May 30, 2021, taking the loss against the Chiba Lotte Marines. He only pitched in one game in total, he was unable to produce results in the farm team. Neverauskas returned to the U.S. on October 6, 2021, and released on November 1.

Bonn Capitals
On March 23, 2022, Neverauskas signed with the Bonn Capitals of the German Baseball-Bundesliga. The first inning he pitched in the Bundesliga was an immaculate inning.

Frederick Atlantic League Team
On February 27, 2023, Neverauskas signed with the Frederick Atlantic League Team in the Atlantic League of Professional Baseball.

References

External links
 
 

1993 births
Living people
Altoona Curve players
Bradenton Marauders players
Expatriate baseball players in the United States
Gulf Coast Pirates players
Indianapolis Indians players
Jamestown Jammers players
Lithuanian baseball players
Lithuanian expatriate sportspeople in the United States
Major League Baseball players from Lithuania
Major League Baseball pitchers
Nippon Professional Baseball pitchers
Pittsburgh Pirates players
Sportspeople from Vilnius
State College Spikes players
West Virginia Black Bears players
West Virginia Power players